"La La Land" is a 2001 single by Green Velvet. It was originally released on Relief Records. It peaked at number 12 on the Billboard Dance Club Songs chart.

Track listing

Charts

References

External links
 

2001 singles
2001 songs
American electronic songs